Neyruz may refer to the following:
Nayrouz, a Coptic celebration on Sep. 11
Neyruz, Switzerland, a district of Fribourg
Neyruz-sur-Moudon, a municipality in Switzerland

See also
Nowruz